Thomas J. Brunner (born February 28, 1958) is a South Dakota politician, and served in the South Dakota House of Representatives from 2005 to 2013 and from 2015 to 2021.

Brunner was born on February 28, 1958, in Belle Fourche, South Dakota. He currently has a wife, 7 kids and practices Christianity.

References

Living people
Republican Party members of the South Dakota House of Representatives
21st-century American politicians
People from Belle Fourche, South Dakota
1958 births